The Oxford Latin Dictionary (or OLD) is the standard English lexicon of Classical Latin, compiled from sources written before AD 200. Begun in 1933, it was published in fascicles between 1968 and 1982; a lightly revised second edition was released in 2012.

The dictionary was created in order to meet the need for a more modern Latin-English dictionary than Lewis & Short's A Latin Dictionary (1879), while being less ambitious in scope than the Thesaurus Linguae Latinae (in progress). It was based on a new reading of classical sources, in the light of the advances in lexicography in creating the Oxford English Dictionary.

History 
Although Lewis and Short's Latin Dictionary was widely used in the English world by the end of the nineteenth century, its faults were widely felt among classicists. While Oxford University Press had attempted the creation of a new Latin dictionary as early as 1875, these projects failed. The OLD was spurred by the submission of a report in 1924 by Alexander Souter on the deficiencies of Lewis and Short; he eventually became the dictionary's first editor. The compilation of the more than one million quotations on which the work was based began in 1933. After Souter's retirement in 1939, Cyril Bailey and J.M. Wyllie were appointed co-editors. From 1949, Wyllie was the sole editor, and he was replaced, following tensions among the editorial staff, in 1954 by P.G.W. Glare, who remained in the position until the completion of the lexicon. The dictionary was originally published in eight fascicles at two-yearly intervals from 1968 until 1982. The complete dictionary contains c. 40,000 entries (covering 100,000 senses). It was generally well received by classicists.

Other members of the editorial staff included C.O. Brink (1938–42), E.A. Parker (1939–46), M. Alford (1942–45), J. Chadwick (1946–52), B.V. Slater (1947–49), D.C. Browning (1949–50), W.M. Edwards (1950–69), J.D. Craig (1952–53), C.L. Howard (1952–58), G.E. Turton (1954–70), R.H. Barrow (1954–82), S. Trenkner (1955–57), R.C. Palmer (1957–82), G.M. Lee (1968–82), and D. Raven (1969–70).

In 2012, a second edition of the dictionary was published in two volumes (the binding of the 1982 single-volume edition has a tendency to fall apart under the paper's weight); it removes some English translations now considered to be archaic, and presents the material in a clearer fashion using the Arno typeface.

Comparison with other dictionaries 
Although the OLD was intended as a replacement for Lewis and Short's dictionary from 1879, its lack of information about Latin writings from after AD 200 has drawn criticism from its users. Lewis and Short's coverage of late and ecclesiastical Latin (if inconsistent), combined with the fact that this dictionary is freely available online, has meant that it has remained in continuous use.

The Thesaurus Linguae Latinae is far more ambitious than the OLD, but after more than 100 years only two thirds of this comprehensive dictionary has been published.

See also
A Latin Dictionary
Dictionary of Medieval Latin from British Sources
William Whitaker's Words

References

External links
 Oxford Scholarly Editions Online

1982 non-fiction books
Latin Dictionary, Oxford
Latin dictionaries
20th-century Latin books